Rosso José Serrano Cadena (August 30, 1942) is a former General of the Colombian National Police from 1994 to 2000 during Ernesto Samper's presidency and was one of the masterminds behind the dismantling of the Cali Cartel and Medellín Cartel. Serrano received numerous national and international decorations for his work against illicit drugs, drug-trafficking and the restructuring of the Colombian Police. He is currently working as head of the Colombian diplomatic mission to Austria.

Early years
Born in Vélez, Santander, Serrano joined the Colombian National Police in 1960, attended classes in the "General Santander Police Academy" graduating in Police Administration and also received a doctorate in law and political sciences from La Gran Colombia University.

Public image and recognition 
Serrano was described with words like "hero" in international media outlets. The American Congressman Bob Barr called him a "true hero in the War on Drugs". Serrano was twice chosen as the World's Top Cop by the International Association of Police Chiefs.

The Los Angeles Times wrote in 2000: Serrano’s ability to anticipate change and respond has allowed him to survive four defense ministers and two presidents during his more than five years as police director. That’s impressive for a kid from the little town of Velez who admits that he joined the police at age 17 because he liked the uniform. “Serrano is more than a great policeman,” said Myles Frechette, former U.S. ambassador to Colombia.

Parapolitics Scandal

On May 16, 2007 in a court hearing in Medellín, former paramilitary warlord and commander of the United Self-Defense Forces of Colombia (AUC) Salvatore Mancuso declared that the former director in chief of the Colombian National Police and current ambassador of Colombia to Austria Rosso José Serrano had intervened on behalf of the AUC leaders captured in La Guajira Department which included Rodrigo Tovar Pupo (aka "Jorge 40").

Popular culture 
 In TV Series El cartel is portrayed by the colombian actor Germán Quintero as the character of Javier Ibarra.
In the American crime thriller drama Narcos he is portrayed by the actor Gaston Velandia.

References

External links
fas.org
Rosso Jose Serrano speech - European Union
Calle22 on Rosso Jose Serrano
Univienna.org

1942 births
Living people
Colombian police officers
Colombian parapolitics scandal
Ambassadors of Colombia to Austria